"Between Angels and Insects" is the third single from rock band Papa Roach's second studio album, Infest. The song charted on multiple music charts, most notably hitting the top 20 of the UK all-format charts.

Background
The music video was directed by Joseph Kahn and it features the band playing in a concrete basement/garage. The camera does special effects, such as morphing from angle to angle rapidly, showing the band moshing in slow-motion and even passing through the band's body, revealing their insides, effects that are reminiscent of the film version of Fight Club. Cockroaches appear on several occasions, even coming out of Jacoby Shaddix's mouth when he screams. The song's lyrics feature numerous references to the novel Fight Club by Chuck Palahniuk. A couple of lines in the song, "...working jobs that you hate for that shit you don't need...", "...the things you own, own you now...", are taken directly from a speech by Tyler Durden in the film adaptation of the book.

Track listing

Charts

References

Papa Roach songs
2001 singles
2000 songs
Songs written by Jacoby Shaddix
DreamWorks Records singles
Songs written by Tobin Esperance